Brockphasma is currently a monotypic genus of Asian stick insects in the tribe Necrosciini, erected by G.W.C. Ho, Liu, Bresseel & Constant in 2014.  To date, one species has been recorded from Vietnam.

Species
The Phasmida Species File currently only includes Brockphasma spinifemoralis Ho, Liu, Bresseel & Constant, 2014: found in Bạch Mã National Park; the genus was named after the English stick insect specialist Paul Brock.

References

External links

Phasmatodea genera
Phasmatodea of Asia
Lonchodidae